Khilaaf is a 1991 Indian Bollywood film directed by Rajeev Nagpal and produced by Anil Tarika. It stars Chunky Pandey and Madhuri Dixit in pivotal roles.

Plot
Vikram "Vicky" Vir Pratap Singh (Chunky Pandey) is a poor boy who eventually falls in love with the rich Shweta Sangwan (Madhuri Dixit) and vice versa. However, problems arise between the two families because of status. Shweta's father does not approve of the relationship and tries to create misunderstandings between the two. Some of them work, but Shweta finds out the cruelty of her dad. When he attacks Vicky, he leaves him seriously injured and Shweta is forced to marry Bhanupratap, another man who is only marrying her for her money. However, she leaves the wedding at the last minute and meets Vicky at the hospital where he is getting treated for his injuries, just in time to see him die. Broken physically and emotionally by this, Shweta confronts her dad and tells her she will never forgive him, and even though Vicky has left the world, their love will always triumph. She then commits suicide by jumping over the hospital building, leaving her dad to mourn for her. Vicky and Shweta reunite in death.

Cast
 Chunky Pandey... Vikram "Vicky" Veerpratap Singh 
 Madhuri Dixit... Shweta "Sonu" R. Sangwan 
 Anupam Kher... Rana Ranjit Singh Sangwan 
 Mahesh Anand ... Kunwer Bhanupratap Chauhan
 Dina Pathak... Mrs. Singh 
 Om Shivpuri... Police Commissioner 
 Aruna Irani... Doctor 
Nadira ... Mrs. Chauhan

Soundtrack

References

External links

1990s Hindi-language films
1991 films
Films scored by Laxmikant–Pyarelal